Atesh (Crimean Tatar: Ateş, literally "Fire") is a military partisan movement in the occupied territories of Ukraine, as well as in the territory of Russia, created by Ukrainians, Crimean Tatars and Russians in September 2022 as a result of the Russian military invasion.

History 
The movement was founded at the end of September 2022. On September 26, the oath of the soldier "Atesh" was published on the official Telegram channel, and on September 29, a video appeal of one of the partisans was made public with an appeal to join the movement.

November 11, 2022: Partisans of the movement liquidated 30 Russian servicemen in hospitals in Simferopol.

December 11, 2022: "Atesh" took responsibility for setting fire to barracks with Russian soldiers in the village Sovietske.

January 31, 2023: Partisans claim they liquidated two Russian National Guard officers.

February 10, 2023: "Atesh" claimed responsibility for a car bomb attack that resulted in the deaths of two Russian soldiers and the hospitalisation of two others in occupied Nova Kakhovka.

March 14, 2023: Atesh claimed to have killed the deputy head of the military administration of Nova Kakhovka in a bomb attack.

See also 
 Ukrainian resistance during the 2022 Russian invasion of Ukraine
 2022 protests in Russian-occupied Ukraine
 Popular Resistance of Ukraine
 Berdiansk Partisan Army

References

External links

Russian occupation of Ukraine
Resistance during the 2022 Russian invasion of Ukraine
Organizations established in 2022
Social movements
Guerrilla organizations